Sis Rural District may refer to:
 Sis Rural District (Shabestar County)
 Sis Rural District (Kurdistan Province)